Red Sound Systems are a British manufacturer of music equipment. In the past, the company has manufactured the Darkstar and optional Vocoda kit, the Darkstar XP2 and Elevata synthesizers. The company has also manufactured DJ equipment such as the Federation BPM FX Pro and the Beat Xtractor1.

References

Further reading

External links
 Official site

Synthesizer manufacturing companies of the United Kingdom
Musical instrument manufacturing companies of the United Kingdom